The Cabinet of President Nana Akufo-Addo consists of the ministers of state appointed by Ghanaian President Nana Akufo-Addo. The cabinet takes responsibility for making key government decisions in Ghana following the 2016 elections. The president announced his cabinet in May 2017.

Formation
The Cabinet was formed in May 2017 and consists of nineteen ministers of state.

List

See also
Cabinet of Ghana

References

Nana Akufo-Addo
Akufo-Addo
Akufo-Addo